Larisa Neiland and Mark Woodforde were the defending champions but only Neiland competed that year with John-Laffnie de Jager.

Neiland and de Jager lost in the final 6–3, 6–7(5–7), 7–5 against Manon Bollegraf and Rick Leach.

Seeds
Champion seeds are indicated in bold text while text in italics indicates the round in which those seeds were eliminated.

Draw

Final

Top half

Bottom half

References
 1997 Australian Open – Doubles draws and results at the International Tennis Federation

Mixed Doubles
Australian Open (tennis) by year – Mixed doubles